Mount Kibal'chich is the highest peak,  high, of the Kvaevenutane Peaks, in the Payer Mountains of Queen Maud Land, Antarctica. It was discovered and plotted from air photos by the Third German Antarctic Expedition, 1938–39, and was mapped from air photos and surveys by the Sixth Norwegian Antarctic Expedition, 1956–60. It was remapped by the Soviet Antarctic Expedition, 1960–61, and named after the Russian revolutionary Nikolai Kibalchich.

References

Mountains of Queen Maud Land
Princess Astrid Coast